Teju Babyface is the stage name of Gbadewonuola Olateju Oyelakin , a Nigerian standup comedian, talk show host, producer and writer. He introduced a new genre of talk to the Nigerian TV space with The Teju Babyface Show in the year 2010. He is also known by many in Nigeria as The King of Talk.

Starting his entertainment career in 1999 after playing the lead role in director Tade Ogidan’s movie franchise Diamond Ring. Teju Babyface also appeared in the Late Amaka Igwe's National TV series, Solitaire in 2001 where he played the lead opposite Richard Mofe-Damijo once again. He also appeared on a TV drama series titled One Too Much within the same period. He has also written two books Secrets Of The Streets: 23 Secrets For Achieving Success With Talent and Forget Principles, Find A Mentor: How To Connect With The People Who Will Help You Get From Where You Are To Where You Need To Be In Life. In 2020, These two books were published under the single title, Secrets Of The Streets: Twenty-Three Secrets For Making Money With Your Talent That You Will Never Learn In School.

He was appointed a United Nations Sustainable Development Goals Ambassador for Nigeria in 2017. His SDG goals are decent work and economic growth.

Career 

Oyelakin auditioned to become a member of the University of Lagos theatre outfit, Theatre 15, in his fresh year and would go on to appear in many stage productions and plays on the campus including Jambitoast, Hell's Invitation, Nightmare, Dawn of Decisions, His Wife The Waif and many others. It was whilst a member of this group that he was cast as the main character in Tade Ogidan's movie Diamond Ring (1998). A promising acting career notwithstanding, he always had a yearning for the funny and he devoted himself almost completely to becoming a standup comedian upon graduation. In the year 2000, he featured on The Nite of a Thousand laffs a very popular comedy concert in Nigeria and this gave him the impetus to establishing himself as one of the comedians of reckoning in the country.

In 2010 Oyelakin developed The Teju Babyface Show for television. In production for its 11th Season, the show has played host to celebrities and personalities.

Personal life 

Teju Babyface was born on January 20, 1979.

On September 2012, Oyelakin married Oluwatobiloba Banjoko.o. In 2018, they had twin children.

References

External links 

1979 births
Living people
Nigerian entertainment industry businesspeople
Male actors from Lagos
University of Lagos alumni
Yoruba comedians
Nigerian male comedians
Yoruba male actors
Nigerian male film actors
Nigerian male television actors
20th-century Nigerian actors